John Chiang may refer to:

David Chiang (born 1947), also known as John Chiang, Hong Kong actor
John Chiang (Taiwan) (born 1942), Taiwanese politician
John Chiang (California politician) (born 1962), American politician
Johnny Chiang (born 1972), Taiwanese politician